Limimaricola variabilis is a Gram-negative, aerobic and rod-shaped bacterium from the genus of Limimaricola which has been isolated from tidal flat sediments from the South Sea from Korea.

References 

Rhodobacteraceae
Bacteria described in 2014